Kunduz or AZMİM (short for ), is a Turkish tracked amphibious combat engineering armoured bulldozer.

History
The Kunduz was developed and produced in less than four-years work for the Turkish Armed Forces (TSK) by the Turkish company FNSS Defence Systems. The prototype was delivered to the TSK on January 11, 2013 in Ankara. AZMİM will be operated to move earth, clear terrain obstacles, cut steep slopes and stabilize stream banks for easy river crossing of combat vehicles during Turkish Army's amphibious warfare.

The contract to develop the armoured amphibious bulldozer was signed on March 10, 2009 between the Ministry of National Defence and the FNSS. The project, which began to develop on June 15, 2009, foresees the production of twelve units until the end of 2013. The first was delivered on January 11, 2013.

Specifications
AZMİM has two crew, one operator and one attendant. It is capable of shoveling, smoothing, hauling and excavating. Tests showed that it is resistant to land mines and armour-piercing shot and shell. AZMİM is equipped with daylight camera system, night vision device, multi-purpose LED display and air conditioner. Two installed pump-jets enable the amphibious bulldozer to conduct a 360 degrees turning movement in rip current waters.

Operators

References

Bulldozers
Amphibious military vehicles
Military engineering vehicles
Tracked armoured fighting vehicles
Armoured fighting vehicles of Turkey
Post–Cold War military equipment of Turkey
Military vehicles of Turkey
Kunduz
Military vehicles introduced in the 2010s